The Pittsburgh-Des Moines Steel Company (originally the Des Moines Bridge and Iron Company), and often referred to as Pitt-Des Moines Steel or PDM was an American steel fabrication company.  It operated from 1892 until approximately 2002 when its assets were sold to other companies, including Chicago Bridge & Iron Company.  The company began as a builder of steel water tanks and bridges. It also later fabricated the "forked" columns for the World Trade Center in the 1960s, and was the steel fabricator and erector for the Gateway Arch in St. Louis. A number of its works are listed on the National Register of Historic Places.

History
The company was founded in 1892 by two graduates of Iowa State College, William H. Jackson and Berkeley M. Moss. The partners initially contracted to have their steel tanks fabricated by Keystone Bridge Company of Pittsburgh, but soon took on a third partner, Edward W. Crellin, who was operating a small fabricating shop in Des Moines, Iowa. It was at this point that the Des Moines Bridge and Iron Company was formed. The company would ship steel stock from Pittsburgh for the manufacture of a range of engineered products including water towers, bridges, water works and electric plants. Moss left the company around 1905, after a new fabricating plant had been opened in Warren, Pennsylvania in 1900.

In 1916, the name of the company was changed to Pittsburgh-Des Moines Steel Company, and a new headquarters was opened in Pittsburgh. The partnership remained until 1956, when the company was incorporated. It later became Pittsburgh-Des Moines Corporation in 1980, which was later shortened to Pitt-Des Moines, Inc. in 1985. It had also had registered "PDM" as a trademark as early as 1930.

In July 1993, the original site and fabrication works in Des Moines, Iowa (by then called the Des Moines Heavy Bridge Division) was damaged beyond salvage due to flooding from the Raccoon River, causing the site to be permanently closed, and later sold.

In 2001, the company was acquired by the Chicago Bridge & Iron Company. The Warren plant was closed in early 2009 by CB&I. Also in 2001, the company's steel distribution unit was acquired by Reliance Steel & Aluminum Co.

In 2016, PDM relocated its headquarters to the city of Elk Grove, California, where it remains today.

Works
Works include (with variations in attribution so noted):
Beaver Creek Bridge, 180th St. between B and C Aves. over Beaver Cr., Schleswig, Iowa (Des Moines Steel Co.), NRHP-listed
Black River Bridge (Carrizo), Indian Rt. 9 over Black River, Carrizo, Arizona (Pittsburg-Des Moines Steel Co.), NRHP-listed
Black River Bridge (Pocahontas), US 67, over the Black River, Pocahontas, Arkansas (Pittsburgh-Des Moines Steel Co.), NRHP-listed
Buck Grove Bridge, Buck Creek Ave. over Buck Cr., Buck Grove, Iowa (Des Moines Steel Co.), NRHP-listed
Cotter Water Tower, NE of jct. of NE US 62B and State St., Cotter, Arkansas (Pittsburgh Des Moines Steel Co.), NRHP-listed
Cotton Plant Water Tower, jct. of N. Main & N. Vine Sts., Cotton Plant, Arkansas (Pittsburgh Des Moines Steel Co.), NRHP-listed
De Valls Bluff Waterworks, jct. of Hazel and Rumbaugh Sts., De Valls Bluff, Arkansas (Pittsburgh Des Moines Steel Co.), NRHP-listed
East Soldier River Bridge, 120th St. over East Soldier R., Charter Oak, Iowa (Des Moines Steel Co.), NRHP-listed
Elevated Metal Water Tank, Crosby, West side First Ave. E., bet. First and Second Sts. N., Crosby, Minnesota (Des Moines Bridge & Iron Co.), NRHP-listed
Elevated Metal Water Tank, Deerwood, 211 Maple St., Deerwood, Minnesota (Des Moines Bridge & Iron Co.), NRHP-listed
Forsyth Water Pumping Station, 3rd Ave. at the Yellowstone River, Forsyth, Montana (Des Moines Bridge Building Co.), NRHP-listed
Gateway Arch (1963-1965), St. Louis, Missouri (Pittsburgh-Des Moines was the steel fabricator and erector), designated as a National Historic Landmark
Hampton Waterworks, Hunt St., W of Lee St., Hampton, Arkansas (Pittsburg-Des Moines Steel Co.), NRHP-listed
Jefferson Street Viaduct, Jefferson St. over the Des Moines River, Ottumwa, Iowa, NRHP-listed (design plans for a steel viaduct) 
Mineral Springs Waterworks, S. of W. Runnels and S. Hall intersection, Mineral Springs, Arkansas (Pittsburgh Des Moines Steel Company), NRHP-listed
Missisquoi River Bridge, VT 105-A over the Missisquoi R., Richford, Vermont (Pittsburgh—Des Moines Steel Co.), NRHP-listed
Monroe Water Tower, 16th Ave. and 20th St., Monroe, Wisconsin (Des Moines Bridge and Iron Co.), NRHP-listed
Neillsville Standpipe, 325 E. 4th St., Neillsville, Wisconsin  (Pittsburgh-Des Moines Steel Co.), NRHP-listed
Nishnabotna River Bridge, T Ave. over Nishnabotna R., Manilla, Iowa (Des Moines Steel Co.), NRHP-listed
State Highway 29 Bridge at the Colorado River, TX 29 at the Llano Cnty. line, Buchanan Dam, Texas (Pittsburgh-Des Moines Steel Co.), NRHP-listed
State Highway 9 Bridge at the Llano River, US 87, 10 mi. S of TX 29, Mason, Texas (Pittsburgh-Des Moines Steel Co.), NRHP-listed
US 83 Bridge at the Salt Fork of the Red River, US 83, near Wellington, Texas (Pittsburgh-DesMoines Steel Co.; Texas Highway Department), NRHP-listed
Waldo Water Tower, E. Main St. W of the N. Skimmer and E. Main intersection, Waldo, Arkansas (Pittsburgh Des Moines Steel Company), NRHP-listed
Yellow Smoke Park Bridge, pedestrian path over unnamed stream, Denison, Iowa (Des Moines Steel Co.), NRHP-listed

References

Bridge companies
Steel companies of the United States
Construction and civil engineering companies established in 1892
American companies established in 1892
1892 establishments in Iowa
Construction and civil engineering companies of the United States